In mathematics, Nagao's theorem, named after Hirosi Nagao, is a result about the structure of the group of 2-by-2 invertible matrices over the ring of polynomials over a field.  It has been extended by Serre to give a description of the structure of the corresponding matrix group over the coordinate ring of a projective curve.

Nagao's theorem

For a general ring R we let GL2(R) denote the group of invertible 2-by-2 matrices with entries in R, and let R* denote the group of units of R, and let

 

Then B(R) is a subgroup of GL2(R).

Nagao's theorem states that in the case that R is the ring K[t] of polynomials in one variable over a field K, the group GL2(R) is the amalgamated product of GL2(K) and B(K[t]) over their intersection B(K).

Serre's extension
In this setting, C is a smooth projective curve C over a field K.  For a closed point P of C let R be the corresponding coordinate ring of C with P removed.  There exists a graph of groups (G,T) where T is a tree with at most one non-terminal vertex, such that GL2(R) is isomorphic to the fundamental group π1(G,T).

References
 
  
 

Theorems in group theory